The 2017 ISSF Junior World Championships was held in Suhl, Germany for Rifle, Pistol and Target Sprint from 22 June to 29 June 2017 and in Moscow, Russia for Shotgun from 30 August to 11 September 2017.

Results

Rifle/Pistol

Men

Women

Target Sprint

Men

Women

Shotgun

Men

Women

Medal table

Rifle/Pistol

References 

Junior
ISSF Junior World Championships
International sports competitions hosted by Russia
ISSF Junior World Championships
Shooting competitions in Russia
International sports competitions hosted by Germany
ISSF Junior World Championships
Shooting competitions in Germany
ISSF Junior World Championships